Moreno Department is a department of Santiago del Estero Province, Argentina. The capital lies at Quimilí.

The department covers an area of 16,127 km². The population as of 2001 was 28,053. The department contains the following municipalities:

Otumpa

Quimilí
Tintina
Weisburd

Departments of Santiago del Estero Province